Bøverfjorden (sometimes Bæverfjord or Bøverfjord) is a village in the municipality of Surnadal in Møre og Romsdal county, Norway. It lies on the shore of Hamnesfjord along County Road 65 where the Bøvra River empties into the fjord.

Name
Locally, the name of the village is pronounced Bøffjorn. The name is derived from Old Norse Bifrarfjǫrðr 'beaver fjord' with substitution of the Norse first element by Low German bever.

References

External links
Bøverfjorden at Norgeskart

Surnadal
Villages in Møre og Romsdal